The Hand Eye Society is a not-for-profit coalition of projects and people in support of Toronto's video game communities.

The Hand Eye Society Organizes socials, unconferences,  presentations, showcases and established connections with the interactive design community at large.

Current members
 Executive Director, Sagan Yee
 Technology Director, Ken Cho
 Communications, Royel Edwards
 Operations Director, Amanda Wong

Events 
 The Hand Eye Society Participated in Toronto's 2010 Nuit Blanche Festival where they held a booth at the TIFF bell Lightbox called Arcadian Renaissance.
 The Hand Eye Society was At the Toronto FAN EXPO showing off the Torontron.
 In 2011, The Hand Eye Society hosted two incarnations of the Difference Engine Initiative, a program dedicated toward getting more women involved in independent game development.

Current projects
 Game Curious
 WordPlay
 Comics x Games
 Toronto Videogame Database
 Hand Eye Society Socials
 Artsy Games Incubator
 Torontron: a 1982 arcade cabinet that has been retrofitted to play six games created by Toronto independent game artists: Albacross, LockON 2,  Mondrian Provoked, Monster Puncher, Heavy Weather and Night of the Cephalopods. Traveling events include: Nuit Blanche Festival Toronto, the Canadian Zine Fair Canzine Toronto Fan Expo, Flash In The Can, Toronto Comic Arts Festival Function 13, InterAccess and Gamercamp.

Torontron credits 

 Cabinet Retrofitter: Jph Wacheski, Iteration Games
 Project Coordinator: Jim Munroe, No Media Kings
 Cabinet Graphic Design: Nadine Lessio
 Gamemaker Liaison: Jim McGinley, Bigpants Games
 Deployment Officer: Peter Marshall
 Housing Assistance: Rose Bianchini and Jason Van Horne
 Financial Support: Toronto Arts Council, Ontario Arts Council

Partnering projects
 Gamercamp
 TOJam (Toronto Game Jam)

References

External links
   
DeFi Gaming & Staking

Non-profit organizations based in Toronto
Clubs and societies based in Toronto
Video game organizations